is a ward of the city of Sakai in Osaka Prefecture, Japan. The ward has an area of 15.58 km² and a population of 154,846. The population density is 9,945 per square kilometer. The name means "North Ward."

The wards of Sakai were established when Sakai became a city designated by government ordinance on April 1, 2006.

References

External links

Ward office official webpage 

Wards of Sakai, Osaka